Moniepoint Inc, (formerly TeamApt Inc) is a fintech company founded by Tosin Eniolorunda in 2015 which is focused on providing financial solutions for businesses.

Awards 
Moniepoint has been named one of the most promising fintech startups of 2022 by CB Insights. Moniepoint also won the Financial Inclusion Award from the Central Bank Of Nigeria at the International Financial Inclusion Conference 2022 edition.

Fundraising 
In February 2019, Moniepoint announced funding of $5.5 million in a Series A fundraising from Quantum Capital Partners.
 
In July 2021, Moniepoint announced it raised an undisclosed capital in a  Series B Funding round led by Novastar Ventures. The latest funding was $50 million in pre-series C funding led by QED investors, a US-based venture capital firm.

Subsidiaries 

 Moniepoint Microfinance Bank, Nigeria
 Monnify
 AptPay

References

Banks of Nigeria
Online banks
Financial technology companies of Nigeria
Companies established in 2015